Črnova is a settlement in the Municipality of Velenje in northern Slovenia. The area is part of the traditional region of Styria. The entire municipality is now included in the Savinja Statistical Region.

References

External links
Črnova at Geopedia

Populated places in the City Municipality of Velenje